Louie Joseph Sibley (born 13 September 2001) is an English professional footballer who plays for Derby County.

Early life
Sibley was born and raised in Burton upon Trent and attended Paulet High School.

Club career
Sibley has been with Derby County since he joined the  Under-8s. After being named the  2017/18 Academy Player of the Year he signed as a first-year scholar at the beginning of the 2018/19 season. On 12 August 2019 Sibley made his professional debut in the EFL Cup against Scunthorpe United On 28 August of the same year, Sibley received his first senior start, again in the EFL Cup, against Nottingham Forest, which ended in a 3–0 loss.

Sibley made his league debut as a substitute in Derby's 3–0 loss to Reading on 21 December 2019. On 20 June 2020, Sibley scored his first senior hat-trick for Derby on only his second league start, away to Millwall. On 17 September 2020, Sibley signed a new deal with Derby to take him through to the end of the 2023–24 season.

International career
Sibley has represented England at U17, U18 and U19 level.

On 6 September 2021, Sibley made his debut for the England U20s during a 6-1 victory over Romania U20s at St. George's Park.

Career statistics

References

2001 births
Living people
English footballers
Association football midfielders
English Football League players
Derby County F.C. players
England youth international footballers